Monodendri is a village in the Ioannina regional unit (Epirus region) in Greece.

History 
The name "Monodendri" (meaning "lonely tree" or "single tree") came into use only in the beginning of the 19th century. Its origin is in a very large tree, whose remains still existed in 1910. The village was previously considered a neighbourhood of Vitsa.

As with the other Zagori villages, Monodendri enjoyed an extended period of commercial and economic prosperity during the 17th and 18th centuries. There were schools  built, churches in the Byzantine style and luxurious stone manors. The first school, the Scholarcheion, was`founded in 1750. In the school taught among others Paparousis, who later in 1814 taught in the Academy of Bucharest and in Vienna, where he published an article on Physical Science in Logios Hermes (Hermes ho Logios). In the Scholarcheion also taught the renowned Neophytos Dotos (1814–18) and Anastasios Sakellarios from 1825 to 1830, when he left to direct the new Zosimaia School in Ioannina. The school is said to have had also some distinguished students, among them Georgios Gennadios and the revolutionary leader Markos Botsaris from Souli.

Monodendri was the birthplace of the merchants and national benefactors Manthos and Georgios Rizaris, and of Angelos Kitsos (former president of the Rizarios Foundation). There were three schools in Monodendri in the 19th century, a primary school (“Ellinikon” or Common School of Greek Studies  (Greek: Κοινή Σχολή Ελληνικών Μαθημάτων) founded by the brothers Manthos and Georgios Rizaris in 1835) and housed in their original home, an Allelodidaktikon (high school) and a school for girls, the Parthenagogeion, also founded by the Rizaris brothers in 1841.

Orthodox Albanians, locally called "Arvanites", have settled the village after the 15th century, later assimilating into the local population. Sarakatsani have settled at the beginning of the 20th century.

Monodendrites usually immigrated to Macedonia and Southern Greece. Outside Greece, they immigrated to Egypt, Romania, Asia Minor, Africa and the United States.

Architecture

The church of Aghios Athanasios, in the middle of the central square, is of significant historical value. The bequests of the Rizari brothers are visible in the village today, and include the Rizarios Exhibition Center, the Rizarios Handicraft School and the primary school. The amphitheatrically built stone theater, in the village end, is used for cultural festivals during the summer months.

The monastery of St Elias dates from the period of the foundation of Monodendri at the turn of the 15th century. From the same time dates also the church of St George (Agios Georgios). Georgios Gennadios and Markos Botsaris were  during their childhood students at the monastery of St Elias.

 Near the village lies the historic monastery of Agia Paraskevi, built on the edge of the Vikos Gorge. The monastery was founded in 1412 by Michael Voevodas Therianos and the people of Vitsa, as stated on an inscription, during the reign of Carlo I Tocco. It was a property of the monastery of St Elias but was refounded as a nunnery in 1778. The panoramic view from the monastery is spectacular. 

Because of its scenery and traditional architecture Monodendri attracts some tourism, especially during the Christmas period.

Notable Monodendrites
The national benefactors Manthos and Georgios Rizaris, founders of the Rizareios Foundation in Athens in 1841 and of the Rizareios Ecclesiastical School in 1844, while Monodendri was still under Ottoman rule.
Ioannis Koniaris, mayor of Athens in the 19th century.
Dimitrios Semitelos (1828–1898), scholar.
Anastasios Tagis (1839-1900), scholar and teacher.

See also
Zagori
Vikos–Aoös National Park

External links
 Prefecture of Ioannina. Tourist department of Greece

Bibliography

References 

Populated places in Ioannina (regional unit)